Tetu is a fictional character appearing in American comic books published by Marvel Comics.

Fictional character biography

Tetu was a former student at a Wakandan academy, who later tried to overthrow T'Challa as king of Wakanda.

Powers and abilities
Tetu is a magician with the ability to manipulate nature and create portals from different timelines.

Reception
 In 2020, CBR.com ranked Tetu 6th in their "Marvel: Ranking Black Panther's Rogues Gallery" list.
 In 2022, Screen Rant included Tetu in their "15 Most Powerful Black Panther Villains" list.
 In 2022, CBR.com ranked Tetu 7th in their "10 Most Iconic Black Panther Villains" list.

References

Comics characters who can teleport
Fictional shamans
Marvel Comics characters